Martin Guardado (born 1962) is a Salvadorian-born Canadian sociolinguist. He is currently a professor of sociocultural linguistics and applied linguistics at the University of Alberta. His research focuses on heritage language socialization and teaching English as a second language. He is noted for his work on heritage language socialization and for recommending that heritage languages need to be studied multidimensionally as well as from macro and micro perspectives. His recent and current research respectively examines the experiences of Japanese-Canadian mothers in mixed language families in Montreal and the characteristics of mixed language parents across a number of linguistic groups in Alberta.

Career 
Guardado received his Master of Education in Teaching English as a second language in 2001 and his Doctor of Philosophy in Modern language education in 2008 from the University of British Columbia. He taught content-based English, applied linguistics, and teacher education courses at the University of British Columbia between 2001-2009 and at the University of Alberta since 2009. He is Associate Editor of the Canadian Modern Language Review.

Research 
Guardado first became known in the area of heritage language socialization through his paper entitled "Loss and Maintenance of First Language Skills: Case Studies of Hispanic Families in Vancouver", published in the Canadian Modern Language Review, part of his master’s research and for which he won the CMLR Best Graduate Student Paper in 2001. His later work has made several contributions to the heritage language socialization area. He was one of the first scholars to investigate language ideology within heritage languages. He was the first scholar to make a link between heritage languages and the development of cosmopolitan identities. Another original theoretical and methodological contribution is found in his discourse-based framework for conducting heritage language research. His latest research with mixed-language families is attracting scholarly and media attention.

Bibliography

Books 

 Romanowski, Piotr & Guardado, Martin. (Eds.) (2020). The many faces of multilingualism: Language status, learning and use across contexts. New York & Berlin: De Gruyter Mouton.
 Guardado, Martin & Light, Justine. (2020). Curriculum development in English for academic purposes: A guide to practice. London, UK: Palgrave MacMillan.
 Guardado, Martin. (2018). Discourse, ideology and heritage language socialization: Micro and macro perspectives. New York & Berlin: De Gruyter Mouton.

Articles 

 Tsushima, R., & Guardado, M. (2019). “Rules…I want someone to make them clear”: Japanese mothers in Montreal talk about multilingual parenting. Journal of Language, Identity, and Education. doi:10.1080/15348458.2019.1645017

 Mao, Y., Guardado, M., & Meyer, K. R. (2019). Podcasts and English-language learning: A qualitative investigation of organizational, instructional, and learning perspectives. International Journal of Information Communication Technology and Human Development, 31(2), 20-35.

 Guardado, M. (2018). Spanish as a minority/heritage language in Canada and the UK. In K. Potowski (Ed.), The routledge handbook of Spanish as a heritage/minority language (pp. 537-554). New York, NY: Routledge.

 Guardado, M., & Light, J. (2018). Innovation in EAP programmes: Shifting from teaching to learning in curriculum design. In L. T. Wong & W. L. Wong (Eds.), Teaching and learning English for academic purposes: Current research and practices (pp. 143-160). Hauppauge, New York: Nova Science Publishers.

 Guardado, M. (2002). Loss and maintenance of first language skills: Case studies of Hispanic families in Vancouver. The Canadian Modern Language Review/La Revue canadienne des langues vivantes, 58(3), 341-363

References

External links
 Martin Guardado's home page
 Martin Guardado's Google Scholar

Sources 

Academic staff of the University of Alberta
Living people
1962 births
Applied linguists
Sociolinguists